Wayne van Heerden (born 29 March 1979) is a former South African rugby union player, who played mainly as a flanker for the majority of his career before becoming a lock towards the end of his career. He made in excess of 200 first class appearances and retired from professional rugby at the end of the 2013 season.

He currently plays amateur club rugby for Eastern Province Grand Challenge side Port Elizabeth Police.

Career

Mighty Elephants

He made his first class debut for Port Elizabeth-based side  in 2000, playing for them in the domestic Currie Cup and Vodacom Cup competitions for the next six seasons, mainly in the First Division. During this time, he was also included in the  Super Rugby squad in 2002 and 2003.

Griquas

At the start of the 2006 season, he moved to Kimberley to join , where he plied his trade between 2006 and 2009. He also experienced some Super Rugby action during this time, making thirteen appearances for the  during the 2009 Super 14 season.

Suntory Sungoliath

In 2010, he moved to Japanese side Suntory Sungoliath, where he played during the 2009–10 and 2010–11 Top League seasons.

Eastern Province Kings

He was initially named in the  wider training squad for their inaugural season of Super Rugby in 2013, but was subsequently released to their Vodacom Cup squad.

He announced his retirement after the conclusion of the 2013 Currie Cup First Division season.

Representative rugby

Van Heerden also made several appearances for various South African national sides – he played for the South African Schools side in 1997 and 1998, as well as for the Under-19 national side in 1998. He also played for South Africa at Under-21 level in 2000, at Under-23 level in 2001 and for a South African 'A' side in 2001 and 2002.

He joined the rugby sevens circuit in 2001 and represented the South African Sevens side – nicknamed the Blitzbokke – between 2001 and 2005.

In 2011, he also played for the South African Kings at the 2011 IRB Nations Cup competition.

References

1979 births
Living people
People from Graaff-Reinet
South African rugby union players
Eastern Province Elephants players
Griquas (rugby union) players
Cheetahs (rugby union) players
Sharks (rugby union) players
South Africa international rugby sevens players
Rugby union flankers
Rugby union locks